Jansatta Dal (Loktantrik) is a political party in Uttar Pradesh, India, launched by Raghuraj Pratap Singh, commonly known as Raja Bhaiya, in November 2018 at Ramabai Park, Lucknow, during a rally marking his 25 years in politics and after taking feedback from his electorate who overwhelmingly supported for forming a new party.

The party has raised the issues related to caste-based preferences in election and stands against Casteism in Politics. The party has also raised issues regarding disparity in the Reservation system and SC/ST act to non-Dalits, in education and employment. Raja Bhaiyya's party won 2 seats in the Uttar Pradesh elections of 2022. Even after personal targeting by SP candidate Gulshan Yadav and SP president Akhilesh Yadav, Raja Bhaiya won his seat comfortably.

Aside  from Raghuraj Pratap Singh, the party had early support from Akshay Pratap Singh, Vinod Saroj and Shailendra Kumar

See also 
 List of political parties in India

External links

References

Political parties established in 2018
Political parties in Uttar Pradesh
2018 establishments in Uttar Pradesh
Jansatta Dal (Loktantrik)